Spencer-Smith is a British double-barrelled surname. Notable people with the surname include: 
 Arnold Spencer-Smith (1883–1916), English clergyman and member of Ernest Shackleton's Imperial Trans-Antarctic Expedition
 Joshua Spencer-Smith (1843–1928), English cricketer, twin brother of Orlando Spencer-Smith
 Lauren Spencer-Smith, British-born Canadian singer-songwriter
 Orlando Spencer-Smith (1843–1920), English cricketer, twin brother of Joshua Spencer-Smith

See also
Spencer Smith (disambiguation)
List of people with surname Spencer
List of people with surname Smith

Compound surnames
English-language surnames
Surnames of English origin